Hippotion echeclus, the black-based striated hawkmoth, is a moth of the family Sphingidae. *

Distribution 
It is known from southern and eastern India, Myanmar, Thailand, south-eastern China, southern Japan (Ryukyu Archipelago), Malaysia (Peninsular, Sarawak, Sabah), Indonesia (Sumatra, Java, Kalimantan, Lombok, Sumba) and the Philippines (Luzon, Bohol).

Description 
The wingspan is 64–84 mm.

Biology 
Larvae have been recorded on Sesamum indicum and Monochoria hastaefolia in India and Eichhornia crassipes in Thailand.

References

Hippotion
Moths described in 1875
Moths of Japan